The [Diocese of Wagga Wagga is a Latin Church suffragan diocese of the Archdiocese of Sydney, established in 1917, covering the Riverina region of New South Wales in Australia.

St Michael's Cathedral is the seat of the Catholic Bishop of Wagga Wagga. On 12 September 2016, Pope Francis accepted the resignation of Bishop Gerard Hanna due to health and age concerns and appointed Christopher Prowse to be the Apostolic Administrator. On 26 May 2020 Pope Francis announced that Bishop Mark Edwards OMI would be the sixth Bishop of Wagga Wagga, to be installed as Bishop on 22 July 2020 at St Michael's Cathedral.

Bishops

Bishops of Wagga Wagga
The following individuals have been elected as Roman Catholic Bishop of Wagga Wagga:
{| class="wikitable"
!Order
!Name
!Date enthroned
!Reign ended
!Term of office
!Reason for term end
|-
|align="center"| ||Joseph Wilfrid Dwyer ||align="center" |14 March 1918 ||align="center" |11 October 1939 ||align="right" |  ||Died in office
|-
|align="center"| || ||align="center" |16 November 1939 ||align="center" |24 February 1968 ||align="right" | || Died in office  
|-
|align="center"| ||Francis Patrick Carroll ||align="center" |24 February 1968 ||align="center" |25 June 1983 ||align="right" | ||Elevated to Archbishop of Canberra and Goulburn
|-
|align="center"| ||William John Brennan ||align="center" |16 Jan 1984 ||align="center" |5 February 2002 ||align="right" | ||Resigned and appointed Bishop Emeritus of Wagga Wagga
|-
|align="center"| ||Gerard Joseph Hanna ||align="center" |5 February 2002 ||align="center" | ||align="right" | ||Retired due to reaching age 75 and due to ill health and appointed Bishop Emeritus of Wagga Wagga
|-
|align="center"|||Mark Edwards ||align="center" |22 July 2020 ||align="center"| ||align="right" | ||
|-
|}

Coadjutor bishop
Francis Patrick Carroll (1967-1968)

Other priests of this diocese who became bishops
Edward Idris Cassidy, appointed nuncio and titular Archbishop in 1970; future Cardinal
Michael Robert Kennedy, appointed Bishop of Armidale in 2011

Cathedral
Located in Johnston Street, Wagga Wagga, St Michael's Cathedral is a large Gothic Revival styled sandstone cathedral built in two stages. The foundation stone of the first stage of the building comprising the nave and tower base, was laid on 26 April 1885. Completed between 1885 and 1887, the parish church was commissioned by Father Patrick Dunne and designed by architects Tappin, Gilbert & Dennehy, of Melbourne.  The woodwork and carpentry was completed by Charles Hardy. In 1918, when the diocese was erected, St Michael’s became a cathedral.

The second stage followed, that commenced in 1922 and completed in 1925. The architect was W. J. Monks, and the overall construction cost was £34,894. The imposing building was constructed from sandstone, of cruciform plan with clerestoried nave and lofty tower placed to the left of the main façade. In addition, the building consists of side aisles, porch, chancel, sacristy, chapel, and gallery. Roof framings are exposed timber internally and sheeted with slates externally. Walls are rock faced ashlar generally with dressed window and door surrounds and mullions. Internally the altars contain some finely crafted marble pieces and large stained glass windows in groups of three, giving a soft filtered light. A feature of the cathedral is the massive tower bell weighing  cast in the factory of Byrnes, of Dublin. The marble high altar was brought from Carrara, Italy and has subsequently been removed.

Cathedral organ 
George Fincham built a two-manual organ of 10 speaking stops for St Michael's Church in 1887. This was removed in 1892 and installed in the Chapel of St Peter at the Church of England Grammar School, Melbourne. The present organ, installed on the rear gallery in 1999 by Laurie Pipe Organs, was built by Samuel Lewis, an employee of George Fincham, who was his first apprentice as far back as 1864 and his first foreman, it is thought for the Dorcas Street Presbyterian Church in South Melbourne; it originally had two manuals and 17 speaking stops. It was installed at the Presbyterian Church, Denbigh Road, Armidale, in 1911 and in 1939 the mechanical action was converted to tubular-pneumatic by C.W. Andrewartha, who supplied a detached console. The casework with its carved transom rails, may also date from this time. The instrument was rebuilt in 1975 by Laurie Pipe Organs who converted the manual actions back to mechanical, electrified the pedal and stop actions, provided a new attached drawstop console, and supplied new Mixtures to the Great and Swell, a Trumpet 8 ft, and the pedal upper work. In 2011 it was given a small overhaul by Darrell Pitchford. The front facade pipes were changed to silver and the stop mechanisms and pipes were cleaned and adjusted.

Parishes

Albury
Albury North
Albury–Lavington
Albury–Thurgoona
Berrigan
Cathedral

Coolamon
Corowa
Culcairn
Darlington Point–Colleambally/Jerilderie
Finley
Ganmain

Griffith
Holbrook
Howlong
Jerilderie
Junee
Khancoban

Leeton
Lockhart
Mulwala
Narrandera
Tarcutta
The Rock

Tocumwal
Tumbarumba
Urana
Wagga Wagga South
Wagga Wagga West
Wagga Wagga–Kooringal

Schools
The list below shows the schools in the diocese who are governed by Catholic Edution Diocese of Wagga Wagga (CEDWW) https://ww.catholic.edu.au/. Their attributed parish is also shown. The diocese is split into four areas and the schools are allocated based on proximity.

Albury region 
Secondary School
Xavier High School, Albury – North Albury
Primary Schools
 St Patrick's Catholic School – Albury
 St Anne's Catholic School – North Albury
St Mary's Catholic School – Corowa

Griffith region 
Secondary Schools
 Marian Catholic College – Griffith
 St Francis de Sales Regional College – Leeton
Primary Schools
 St Patrick's Primary School – Griffith
 St Joseph's Primary School – Leeton

Wagga Wagga region  
Secondary Schools
 Kildare Catholic College – Our Lady of Fatima, South Wagga Wagga
 Mater Dei Catholic College – Sacred Heart, Kooringal

Primary Schools
 All Saints Catholic Primary School – Tumbarumba
 Henscke Catholic Primary School – Our Lady of Fatima, South Wagga Wagga
 Holy Trinity Catholic Primary School – West Wagga Wagga  
 Mater Dei Catholic Primary School – Sacred Heart, Kooringal
 Sacred Heart Catholic Primary School – Sacred Heart, Kooringal
 Saint Joseph's Catholic Primary School – Cathedral, Central Wagga Wagga
 Saint Joseph's Catholic Primary School – Junee
 Saint Michael's Catholic Primary School – Coolamon
 Saint Brendan’s Catholic Primary School – Ganmain
 Saint Joseph’s Catholic Primary School – Lockhart

See also

Roman Catholicism in Australia

References

External links

Catholic Diocese of Wagga Wagga

 
Wagga Wagga
Wagga Wagga, Roman Catholic Diocese of
Wagga
Wagga
Wagga
Riverina